MŠK Púchov is a Slovak football club, playing in the town of Púchov.

In July 2006, the club lost its main sponsor, Matador a.s., and was renamed FK Púchov. The club has two stadiums, currently unusable Mestský štadión due to disagreement with the town of Púchov, and temporary Futbalový štadión Nosice. On 24 June 2013, the official website of FK Púchov announced merging between OTJ Moravany nad Váhom and FK Púchov, as FK Púchov. The club started cooperate with the town. The town is the main sponsor of the club.

Historical names 

 1920 – Športový klub Puchov
 1945 – ŠK Rolný Púchov
 1948 – Sokol Makyta Púchov
 1956 – TJ Iskra Púchov
 1968 – TJ Gumárne 1.mája Púchov
 1993 – ŠK Matador Púchov
 2003 – FK Matador Púchov
 2007 – FK Púchov
 2015 – MŠK Púchov

Honours 
 Slovak Cup (1961–)
  Winners (1): 2002–03
  Runners-up (1): 2001–02
 Slovak Super Liga (1993–)
  Runners-up (1): 2001–02
 Slovak second division (1993–)
  Winners (1): 1999–00

European competition history

Sponsorship

Current squad 
As of 21 September 2020

For recent transfers, see List of Slovak football transfers winter 2022–23.

Notable players 
Had international caps for their respective countries. Players whose name is listed in bold represented their countries while playing for FK.

Past (and present) players who are the subjects of Wikipedia articles can be found here.

	
 Marek Bakoš
 Ivan Belák
 Mário Breška
 Jozef Chovanec
 Alias Lembakoali
  Ľubomír Luhový
 Milan Luhový
 Krisztián Németh
 Kornel Saláta
 Zdeno Štrba
 Ľubomír Talda
 Salomon Wisdom

Notable Managers

 Anton Richtárik (1993–1994)
 Vladimír Hrivnák (1994–1996)
 Jozef Zigo (1996)
 Štefan Tománek (1996–1998)
 Jozef Šuran (1998–2002)
 František Komňacký (2003)
 Štefan Zaťko (2003)
 Milan Lešický (2003–2004)
 Pavel Vrba (2004–2005)
 Stanislav Mráz (2006–2007)
 Pavol Strapáč (2007–2010)
 Jaroslav Vágner (2010–2017)
 Stanislav Ďuriš (2017–2018)
 Eduard Pagáč (2018–2019)
 Vladimír Cifranič (2019–2020)
 Lukáš Kaplan (2020–2021)
 Marek Šimáček (2021-2022)
 Vladimír Cifranič (2022-)

References

External links 
Futbalnet profile 
  
Club profile at Futbalnet portal 

 
Football clubs in Slovakia
Association football clubs established in 1920
MSK Puchov